Paul Farthing (April 12, 1887 – December 2, 1976) was an American jurist.

Born in Odin, Illinois, Farthing was blinded in a hunting accident when he was twelve years old. Farthing went to the Illinois School for the Blind. He then received his bachelor's degree from McKendree University in 1909 and his law degree from University of Illinois Law School. Farthing practiced law in East St. Louis, Illinois. He served as master in chancery of the city court in East St. Louis, Illinois and as St. Clair County, Illinois judge. From 1933 to 1942, Farthing served on the Illinois Supreme Court and from 1937 to 1938, served as chief justice of the Illinois Supreme Court. Farthing died in Belleville, Illinois.

Notes

1887 births
1976 deaths
People from East St. Louis, Illinois
People from Marion County, Illinois
McKendree University alumni
University of Illinois alumni
Illinois state court judges
Chief Justices of the Illinois Supreme Court
Blind politicians
20th-century American judges
Justices of the Illinois Supreme Court